Kirkayakidae is a family of millipedes belonging to the order Chordeumatida. This family was formerly known as Altajellidae. Adult millipedes in this family have 28 segments (counting the collum as the first segment and the telson as the last) rather than the 30 segments usually found in chordeumatidans.

Taxonomy

The family contains the following four genera:
 Elongeuma Golovatch, 1982
 Kirkayakus Özdikmen, 2008
 Tarbagataya Golovatch & Wytwer, 2003
 Teleckophoron Gulička, 1972

This family was previously known as Altajellidae before genus Altajella was synonymised with Kirkayakus.

References

Chordeumatida